Maringa may refer to:
 Maringa people, a sub-group of the Burarra Aboriginal Australian people
 Maringá, a city in the state of Paraná in southern Brazil
 Maringa River in the Democratic Republic of the Congo
 Maringa-Lopori-Wamba Landscape, an ecologically sensitive area in the Democratic Republic of the Congo
 Nova Maringá, a municipality in the state of Mato Grosso in the Central-West Region of Brazil
 Grêmio de Esportes Maringá, a Brazilian soccer club from the city of Maringá
 Roman Catholic Archdiocese of Maringá, an archdiocese located in the city of Maringá
 Maringá Regional Airport, the airport serving Maringá, Brazil
 Palm-wine music, known as "Maringa" in Sierra Leone